Statute Revision Act is a stock short title used for legislation in Canada which relates to revision of statutes.

List
Alberta
Statute Revision Act, RSA 2000, c S-19 

British Columbia
Statute Revision Act, RSBC 1996, c 440 

New Brunswick
Statute Revision Act, SNB 2003, c S-14.05 
Statute Revision Act, RSNB 2011, c 224 

Newfoundland and Labrador
Subordinate Legislation Revision and Consolidation Act, SNL 1995, c S-29.1 

Northwest Territories
Statute Revision Act, SNWT 1996, c 16 

Nova Scotia
Statute Revision Act, RSNS 1989, c 443 

Nunavult
An Act Respecting the Statute Revision Act, SNWT (Nu) 1987(1), c 32 
Statute Revision Act, SNWT (Nu) 1996, c 16 

Ontario
Statute and Regulation Revision Act, 1998, SO 1998, c 18, Sch C 

 Saskatchewan

Statutes and Regulations Revision Act, SS 1995, c S-59.01

See also
List of short titles

Lists of legislation by short title